The Massachusetts State Collegiate Athletic Conference (MASCAC) is an intercollegiate athletic conference affiliated with the NCAA's Division III. Full member institutions are all located in the Commonwealth of Massachusetts with some affiliate members also located in Connecticut and New Hampshire. All full members are a part of the Massachusetts State Universities system (every member in the Massachusetts State Universities system except the Massachusetts College of Art and Design (MassArt) is also a MASCAC member)  and the public associate members are part of the University of Massachusetts System (UMASS System (UMASS Dartmouth)), the University System of New Hampshire (Plymouth State University), and the Connecticut State University System (Western Connecticut State University) respectively. The rest of the associate members are private colleges.

History

Chronological timeline
 1971 - In June 1971, the Massachusetts State Collegiate Athletic Conference (MASCAC) was founded. Charter members included Boston State College, Bridgewater State College (now Bridgewater State University), Fitchburg State College (now Fitchburg State University), Framingham State College (now Framingham State University), Lowell State College, North Adams State College (now the Massachusetts College of Liberal Arts (MCLA)), Salem State College (now Salem State University), Westfield State College (now Westfield State University) and Worcester State College (now Worcester State University), effective beginning the 1971–72 academic year.
 1974 - Massachusetts Maritime Academy (Mass Maritime) joined the MASCAC, effective in the 1974–75 academic year.
 1975 - Lowell State College left the MASCAC when it was merged into Lowell Technological Institute to become the University of Lowell (now the University of Massachusetts Lowell (UMass Lowell)), effective after the 1974–75 academic year.
 1982 - Boston State College left the MASCAC when it was merged into the University of Massachusetts Boston (UMass Boston), effective after the 1981–82 academic year.

Member schools

Current members 
The MASCAC currently has eight full members, all are public schools:

Notes

Associate members 
The MASCAC currently has seven associate members, all but three are private schools:

Former members 
The MASCAC had two former full members, both were public schools:

Notes

Former associate member 
The MASCAC had one former associate member, which was also a private school:

Membership timeline

Sports 

The MASCAC sponsors intercollegiate athletic competition in men's baseball, men's and women's basketball, men's and women's cross country, women's field hockey, men's ice hockey, men's golf, men's and women's soccer, women's softball, men's and women's track and field, and women's volleyball.

The MASCAC sponsored football for the first time in 2013. Conference members Bridgewater State, Fitchburg State, Framingham State, Massachusetts Maritime, Westfield State, and Worcester State departed the New England Football Conference (NEFC) (now Commonwealth Coast Football) after the 2012 season. They were joined later by fellow NEFC opponents Plymouth State, UMass–Dartmouth, and Western Connecticut State. The NEFC retained the conference's automatic bid to the NCAA Division III playoffs.

On August 22, 2019, the MASCAC invited 5 of the recently dropped men's golf members from the New England Collegiate Conference (NECC) which includes Dean College, Eastern Nazarene College, Elms College, Mitchell College, and Springfield College; all of them are private colleges which is the first time that the MASCAC awarded membership to private colleges. The 5 private colleges joined the other men's golf sponsoring MASCAC schools from the NECC which includes MCLA, Salem State, Westfield State, and Worcester State to create a 9-team men's golf league. However Dean College men's golf left the MASCAC after the 2019-20 men's golf season to join their primary conference the Great Northeast Athletic Conference (GNAC) in men's golf. The MASCAC started Automatic Qualification (AQ) to the NCAA Division III Men's Golf Championships in the 2021–2022 season for the MASCAC men's golf tournament winner.

Men's sports

Women's sports

References

External links
 

 
NCAA Division III ice hockey conferences